Entrance Island is a small rocky island in the Strait of Georgia located  due north of Gabriola Island.  Marine mammals such as harbour seals and Steller's sea lions use the island as a haul-out.

Entrance Island Lighthouse

The Entrance Island Lighthouse is a manned light station.  It was built in 1875 to guide ships into Nanaimo harbour from the Strait of Georgia, and is easily seen from the Horseshoe Bay to Departure Bay ferry. The Tsawwassen to Duke Point ferry passes right by it.

Oceanographic research

The Entrance Island Lighthouse is one of 12 lighthouses part of the British Columbia Shore Station Oceanographic Program, collecting coastal water temperature and salinity measurements everyday since 1936.  Their data show an increase in coastal water temperatures of 0.15 °C per decade. This trend is believed to be a result of anthropogenic climate change.

See also
 List of lighthouses in British Columbia
 List of lighthouses in Canada

References 

 The Entrance Island Lighthouse The Gabriola Historical & Museum Society. Retrieved 22 January 2012.

External links
 Aids to Navigation Canadian Coast Guard
 

Islands of British Columbia